"The World of Lonely People" is a song written by Buddy Kaye and Mort Garson and performed by Anita Bryant.  The song reached #17 on the U.S. Adult Contemporary chart and #59 on the Billboard Hot 100 in 1964.  The song appeared on her 1964 album, The World Of Lonely People.

Jimmy Justice released a version of the song as a single in February 1963 which did not chart.

References

1963 singles
1964 singles
Songs written by Mort Garson
Anita Bryant songs
Columbia Records singles
Songs with lyrics by Buddy Kaye
1963 songs